Dada v. Mukasey, 554 U.S. 1 (2008), was a United States Supreme Court case involving deportation procedures.

Background
Samson T. Dada was a citizen of Nigeria who had married an American citizen. When immigration officials tried to deport him for overstaying his visa, he appealed, claiming his marriage entitled him to remain in the United States. The Court ruled, in a 5–4 decision, that complying with a deportation order did not strip an immigrant of the right to appeal that deportation order.

Opinion of the Court
Justice Anthony Kennedy wrote the majority opinion, joined by Justices John Paul Stevens, David Souter, Ruth Bader Ginsburg, and Stephen Breyer. Justice Antonin Scalia was joined by Justices John Roberts and Clarence Thomas in his dissent. Justice Samuel Alito wrote a separate dissent.

See also
List of United States Supreme Court cases, volume 554
2007 term opinions of the Supreme Court of the United States

Further reading

References

External links
 

United States Supreme Court cases
United States Supreme Court cases of the Roberts Court
United States immigration and naturalization case law
2008 in United States case law